Al Terrill (March 8, 1937 – August 20, 2008) was an American politician. He served as a Democratic member for the 32nd district of the Oklahoma Senate.

Life and career 
Terrill was born in Walters, Oklahoma. He attended Abilene Christian University and Southwestern Oklahoma State University.

In 1965, Terrill was elected to represent the 32nd district of the Oklahoma Senate, succeeding Tom Payne. He left office in 1987, and was succeeded by Roy Butch Cooper.

Terrill died in August 2008, at the age of 71.

References 

1937 births
2008 deaths
People from Walters, Oklahoma
Democratic Party Oklahoma state senators
20th-century American politicians
Abilene Christian University alumni
Southwestern Oklahoma State University alumni